Philip Key may refer to:

 Philip Key (U.S. politician), Representative of the State of Maryland in the United States Congress from 1791 to 1792
 Philip Barton Key, Representative of the State of Maryland in the United States Congress from 1807 to 1812
 Philip Barton Key II, murder victim in a controversial nineteenth-century trial